Sokkate was acting governor of Prome (Pyay) for three months in 1413.  He was a commander in the Royal Ava Army, and temporarily assumed governorship of Prome after Gov. Letya Pyanchi of Prome died of wounds  April 1413. Sokkate was succeeded by Crown Prince Minye Kyawswa, who became the governor-general of Prome.

Military service

Notes

References

Bibliography
 
 
 

Ava dynasty